The Pizza Head Show (also known as The Pizza Hut Head Show or simply Pizza Head) was a live action advertising campaign used by Pizza Hut commercials from 1991 to 1999 to advertise their promotions and new menu items. The commercials starred a slice of pizza named Pizza Head, who had a face made out of different toppings, and his pizza cutter nemesis named Steve who would try to cause him as much harm as possible. These advertising campaigns were produced by San Francisco's Goodby Silverstein & Partners and were directed by Walter Williams in a style similar to his earlier work, The Mr. Bill Show, which was a series of Saturday Night Live skits.

History
On June 19, 1991, Pizza Hut sought to attract older youngsters, specifically 12-year-olds, to build its dine-in business. Through comedy writer Walter Williams and San Francisco advertising agency Goodby Silverstein & Partners, Pizza Hut created The Pizza Head Show series of television commercials to convey the message that Pizza Hut meant weird fun, the commercials featured spokes-character "Pizza Head" and his pizza-cutter nemesis, "Steve."

Pizza Head was a high-pitched Mr. Bill-to-Furcorn-to-Mickey Mouse-like-voiced, slice of pizza whose facial features were olives, pepperoni and other toppings.  Comedy writer Williams was creator of the Mr. Bill Show.

The spots were rather simple, paralleling the old Mr. Bill segments. Each commercial would open with a picture of a Pizza Hut restaurant having the words "The Pizza Head Show" appear over the picture. Pizza Head then would appear, talk to the audience, and get into a jam. The host of the commercials was a voice represented by a hand (similar to "Mr. Hands" from the Mr. Bill shorts). The hand would then introduce Steve, who would take on a different persona in every commercial, such as "Chef Steve", "Coach Steve",, etc.; similarly to Mr. Bill, when he saw his nemesis, Sluggo, Pizza Head would then see through Steve's disguise and respond with "Hey, he's not a/an (occupation)"  The hand would reassure Pizza Head ("Sure he is!"), but Steve then would humorously harm Pizza Head (i.e. getting Pizza Head hit by an incoming soccer ball, flung face-first into wet cement, or struck with a baseball bat). Some of the commercials ended with the destruction of the model of a Pizza Hut restaurant from the beginning of the commercial, typically by whatever harmed Pizza Head in the commercial, or something relating to the theme (such as getting crushed by a jack-o-lantern, stepped on by a large-footed basketball player, getting crushed by a hospital gurney, etc.). The narrator would then say, "See ya next time!" then followed by a promotion sometimes announced. The commercials ran from 1991 to 1999. There were also Pizza Head and Steve mazes that came out in 1997 for Pizza Hut.

List of episode names (in order of airing)/Promotion
Pizza Head Gets Crusty/No promotion
Pizza Head Shoots Hoops/Streetball for $4.99
Pizza Head to the Rescue/Marvel Comics pack for only $2.99 with a cup, comic, and card
Pizza Head Flies High/K'Nex with purchase of $2.99 Munch Down Meal
Pizza Head Gets a Kick/No promotion
Pizza Head's Trick or Treat/New Stuffed crust pizza
Pizza Head Parties Hard/Pizza Hut Delivery
Pizza Head's Big Night/Tuesdays are Kids Night at Pizza Hut
Pizza Head Fouls Out/Autographed baseball bat and ball for $5.99
Pizza Head's Alien Adventure/New Stuffed Crust Pizza
Pizza Head's Magic Show/New Triple Decker Pizza
Pizza Head's Slam Dunk/Rawlings Basketball for $4.99
Pizza Head's Check Up/Pizza Hut pizza now with more pepperoni
Pizza Head's Star Wars/Get one of 3 Star Wars posters with a Pizza Hut Kids Pack (A shortened version of this ad was also produced)
Pizza Head Gets Goosebumps/Get Goosebumps Glow and Tell Story Card Sets
Pizza Head on a Quest/Get a Jonny Quest pack when you get a Pizza Hut Kids Pack (two different commercials exist for this promotion with different scenarios for Pizza Head)

Steve's Disguises 

Episode One: Pizza Head Gets Crusty - Chef Steve

Episode Two: Pizza Head Shoots Hoops - Coach Steve

Episode Three: Pizza Head to the Rescue - Super Steve

Episode Four: Pizza Head Flies High - Engineer Steve & Pilot Steve

Episode Five: Pizza Head Gets a Kick - Coach Steve (this was his only disguise to appear in more than one commercial)

Episode Six: Pizza Head's Trick or Treat - Count Steve and Mummy Steve

Episode Seven: Pizza Head Parties Hard - Party Guy Steve, Officer Steve, and Prisoner Steves

Episode Eight: Pizza Head's Big Night - Steve-ette

Episode Nine: Pizza Head Fouls Out - Umpire Steve

Episode Ten: Pizza Head's Alien Adventure - Steve-ians (Steve-ians speak to Pizza Head themselves; only episode without the Narrator aside from the opening line)

Episode Eleven: Pizza Head's Magic Show - The Amazing Steve-ini

Episode Twelve: Pizza Head's Slam Dunk - Referee Steve

Episode Thirteen: Pizza Head's Check-up - Dr. Steve and Surgeon Steve’s

Episode Fourteen: Pizza Head's Star Wars - Princess Steve-a and Darth Steve

Episode Fifteen: Pizza Head Gets Goosebumps - Scarecrow Steve

Episode Sixteen: Pizza Head on a Quest - Jonny Steve, Hadji Steve, Jessie Steve, and QuestWorld Jonny Steve

In some commercials, numerous Steves would be utilized for crowd shots.

References

External links
Pizza Head shows for download
Pizza Head On A Quest at RetroJunk

American television commercials
Pizza Hut
1990s television commercials